Mount Holly is a mountain located in the Catskill Mountains of New York east-southeast of Walton, New York. Located to the east is Colchester Mountain and southeast is Starkweather Hill.

References

Mountains of Delaware County, New York
Mountains of New York (state)